Koiak 22 - Coptic Calendar - Koiak 24

The twenty-third day of the Coptic month of Koiak, the fourth month of the Coptic year. On a common year, this day corresponds to December 19, of the Julian Calendar, and January 1, of the Gregorian Calendar. This day falls in the Coptic season of Peret, the season of emergence. This day falls in the Nativity Fast.

Commemorations

Saints 

 The departure of the Righteous David, the Prophet and the King 
 The departure of Saint Timothy, the Anchorite

References 

Days of the Coptic calendar